Padmabhushan Vasantdada Patil Pratishthan's College of Engineering (PVPP COE) is an engineering college in Mumbai, India, established in 1991.

The college is a tribute to the late Shri Vasantdada Patil, the Sahakar Maharshi and former Chief Minister of Maharashtra. It is registered under Societies’ Registration Act, 1860 and Bombay Public Trust Act, 1950. Former deputy Prime Minister Yeshwantrao Chavan laid the foundation of the college.

It is located in the centre of Mumbai, on the Eastern Express Highway at Sion. It is approved by the Government of Maharashtra, University of Mumbai, and All India Council for Technical Education (AICTE) to conduct degree courses in electronics and telecommunications, computer engineering, and information technology engineering.

See also
 List of colleges in Mumbai

References

External links
 Official site of PVPPCOE

All India Council for Technical Education
Engineering colleges in Mumbai
University of Mumbai